Prays curalis is a moth of the  family Plutellidae.

External links
Prays curalis at Zipcodezoo.com.

Plutellidae
Moths described in 1914